Joel K. Goldman (born October 23, 1952) is an American author and former trial attorney. He attended Shawnee Mission East High School, where he participated in the school's debate team. and the University of Kansas as well as Moot Court. He suffers from a tic disorder, which he incorporated into one of his works, the Jack Davis series.
In September 2014, Goldman launched the publishing company Brash Books  with novelist Lee Goldberg. The company publishes award-winning, highly acclaimed crime novels that have fallen out of print by authors like Bill Crider, Mark Smith, Carolyn Weston, Tom Kakonis, Maxine O'Callaghan, Gar Anthony Haywood, Jack Lynch, among others.

Awards
 Thorpe Menn Award for Literary Excellence (2005)

Bibliography

Novels
Ireland and Carter Thrillers

 All In  - with Lisa Klink (2017)
 All Gone - with Lisa Klink (2018)

Lou Mason Thrillers
Motion to Kill (2002)
The Last Witness (2003)
Cold Truth (2004) 
Deadlocked (2005)
Final Judgment (2012)

Jack Davis Thrillers
Shake Down (2008)
The Dead Man (2009)
No Way Out (2010)

Alex Stone Thrillers
Stone Cold (2012)
Chasing the Dead (2013)

Short Stories
Fire in the Sky (2011)
Knife Fight (2009)

Other Books
Three to Get Deadly (3 novels by Joel Goldman, Lee Goldberg, Paul Levine)
The Dead Man, vol 4 (Freaks Must Die) – with Lee Goldberg & William Rabkin (2012) (print) 
The Dead Man, vol 10 (Freaks Must Die) – with Lee Goldberg & William Rabkin (2012) (ebooks)

Anthologies
Top Suspense – 12 Master Storytellers
The Prosecution Rests 
Die Lover Die (2011)
Favorite Kills

Non Fiction
Writing Crime Fiction – Advice from authors of Top Suspense group (2012)

References

External links
 
 *  Two Authors Launch Brash Books "Publishers Weekly"

1952 births
Living people
People from Johnson County, Kansas
University of Kansas School of Law alumni
Writers from Kansas
Novelists from Kansas
American publishers (people)
American crime fiction writers